Arthur J. Krim is a geographer and architectural historian. He was a founding member of the Society for Commercial Archeology, a preservationist group.

Krim has taught at the Boston Architectural Center, Clark University, and Salve Regina University, and has consulted for the Cambridge Historical Commission, Massachusetts Historical Commission and others. He has published in Landscape, the Journal of Cultural Geography, and the Journal of Historical Geography. In 2016, he was an advocate for designating the Boston Citgo sign, which The Atlantic called "one of the hub's best known pieces of technology" but was threatened with dismantling, as a historic landmark. The Boston Globe referred to Krim as "the sign's unofficial historian".

Books

Krim wrote the book Route 66: Iconography of the American Highway (originally published in 2005), about U.S. Route 66, which received the J. B. Jackson prize of the American Association of Geographers for the best book in cultural geography in 2006.

Notes

American architectural historians
American geographers
Living people
Boston Architectural College
Clark University faculty
Salve Regina University faculty
Year of birth missing (living people)
People from Cambridge, Massachusetts